was a Japanese game development company based in Tokyo.

Games developed

 J.League Excite Stage (Super Famicom - 1996) J.League Excite Stage '96
 Rugrats: Totally Angelica (PlayStation - 2001)
 Scooby-Doo and the Cyber Chase (PlayStation - 2001)
 Britney's Dance Beat (Game Boy Advance - 2002)
 Disney Princess - (Game Boy Advance - 2003)
 Oddworld: Munch's Oddysee (Game Boy Advance - 2003)
 Space Channel 5: Ulala's Cosmic Attack (Game Boy Advance - 2003)
 Flushed Away (Nintendo DS - 2006)
 Every Extend Extra - (PlayStation Portable - 2006/2007)
 Gunpey - (PlayStation Portable - 2006/2007)
 InuYasha: Secret of the Divine Jewel (Nintendo DS - 2007)
 Ed, Edd n Eddy: Scam of the Century (Nintendo DS - 2007)
 Shaun the Sheep (Nintendo DS - 2008)
 Coraline: An Adventure Too Weird for Words (Nintendo DS - 2009)
 Shaun the Sheep: Off His Head (Nintendo DS - 2009)
 Ant Nation (Nintendo DS and Wii - 2009)
 Astro Boy: The Video Game (Nintendo DS - 2009)
 Dream Trigger 3D (Nintendo 3DS - 2011)
 Family Party: 30 Great Games Obstacle Arcade (Wii U - 2012) 
 Kotodama: The 7 Mysteries of Fujisawa (Microsoft Windows, Nintendo Switch, PlayStation 4 - 2019)

References

External links
  

Video game companies of Japan
Video game development companies
Video game companies established in 1995
Japanese companies established in 1995